Samantha Shaver  (born July 20, 1969) is a retired American female volleyball player. She was part of the United States women's national volleyball team.

She participated in the 1994 FIVB Volleyball Women's World Championship. On club level she played with UCLA.

Clubs
 UCLA (1994)

References

External links

1969 births
Living people
American women's volleyball players
Place of birth missing (living people)
Opposite hitters
UCLA Bruins women's volleyball players